Robert Dominic "Bob" Forte (July 15, 1922March 12, 1996) was an American football halfback/defensive back/linebacker in the  National Football League. He played for the Green Bay Packers (1946–1950, 1952–1953).

1922 births
1996 deaths
People from Lake Village, Arkansas
Players of American football from Arkansas
American football halfbacks
American football defensive backs
American football linebackers
Arkansas Razorbacks football players
Green Bay Packers players